Saud Hamood Yahya Hasan (Arabic: سعود حمود يحيى حسن) is a football player, who plays as a striker, in Saudi Arabia.

He joined Al-Nasr in the summer of 2009, having left the Al-Riyadh club of Riyadh.

References

Living people
Saudi Arabian footballers
1989 births
Al-Riyadh SC players
Al Nassr FC players
Al-Shoulla FC players
Al-Mujazzal Club players
Sportspeople from Riyadh
Saudi Professional League players
Saudi First Division League players
Saudi Third Division players
Association football forwards